Rock 'n' Roll High School is a 1979 American musical comedy film. It can also refer to:
"Rock 'n' Roll High School (song)", a song by American punk rock group the Ramones
Rock 'n' Roll High School Forever, a 1991 musical comedy film and sequel to the 1979 film
Rock 'n' Roll Highschool, studio album by the band Teddybears STHLM

See also
Rock and roll (disambiguation)